The Medal of Honor Memorial is a monument located in White River State Park in Indianapolis, Indiana, United States. It is dedicated in honor of all recipients of the Medal of Honor, the United States military's highest award for valor. The memorial was unveiled May 28, 1999, during Memorial Day weekend. The memorial is part of the Indiana War Memorials Commission.

Design
The Memorial is located on the north bank of the Indiana Central Canal, adjacent to Military Park, and consists of 27 glass panels set in concrete bases. Indiana Limestone in shades of buff, gray, and pink are also a part of the monument. The panels are arranged into 15 walls, each representing an armed conflict in which a Medal of Honor was awarded. The names of the recipients are etched into the glass. At the time of dedication, there were 3,436 Medal of Honor recipients etched into the monument.

The Memorial also contains an elaborate lighting system that illuminates certain panels to correspond with a 30-minute audio tour that is played over a speaker system. The audio tour is made up of stories about the wars, and accounts of living Medal recipients. Many of the stories were recorded by Medal of Honor recipients.

Origin
After reading an article in The New York Times about a June 1998 meeting in upstate New York of the Congressional Medal of Honor Society, John Hodowal, chairman of the Indianapolis-based Indianapolis Power & Light (IPALCO), and his wife, Caroline, were inspired to assist in the creation of a memorial to honor these individuals whose courageous acts earned them the Medal of Honor, the United States' highest military honor. The site that was chosen was the same area where Indianapolis' first recorded Independence Day celebration was held. Additionally, the site was utilized as a military camp during the U.S. Civil War.

Construction and dedication
Site preparation began in November 1998, and construction of the memorial began in January 1999. 96 living Medal of Honor recipients attended the unveiling and dedication of the monument on May 28, 1999, the last Memorial Day of the millennium.

Designers and sponsor
The designers of the monument were architect landscape artists Eric Fulford and Ann Reed of ROAMworks. IPALCO Enterprises sponsored the monument.

Award
The Memorial received a 2001 Merit Award from the American Society of Landscape Architects.

See also
United States Naval Academy Cemetery#Medal of Honor recipients
Kentucky Medal of Honor Memorial
 Oregon Veterans Medal of Honor Memorial
Texas Medal of Honor Memorial

References

Medal of Honor
Military monuments and memorials in the United States
Monuments and memorials in Indiana
Buildings and structures in Indianapolis
White River State Park
1999 sculptures
Cultural infrastructure completed in 1999
Glass works of art
Concrete sculptures in Indiana
Tourist attractions in Indianapolis
Limestone sculptures in Indiana
1999 establishments in Indiana